Major Sir Archibald Boyd Boyd-Carpenter (26 March 1873 – 27 May 1937) was a British Conservative Party politician.

Career

The fourth son of William Boyd-Carpenter, Bishop of Ripon and Canon of Westminster, Archibald Boyd-Carpenter was educated at Harrow School and at Balliol College, Oxford, where he was Secretary and President of the Oxford Union. Following college he worked for three years in the editorial staff of the Yorkshire Post.

With the start of the Second Boer War in late 1899, Boyd-Carpenter volunteered for active service and was commissioned with the Imperial Yeomanry, seeing service in South Africa attached to the Highland Light Infantry. He was promoted to captain on 17 April 1901, and was from 1901 to 1902 Staff Captain to Major-General Lord Chesham, and Brigadier General Herbert Belfield while they served as Inspector general of Imperial Yeomanry. For his service in the war, he was mentioned in dispatches and awarded the Queen's medal (with 3 clasps) and the King's medal (with 2 clasps). After the war ended in June 1902, he returned home with Belfield in the SS Kinfauns Castle leaving Cape Town two months later, and relinquished his commission in the Imperial Yeomanry in October 1902. He later served in the First World War.

He was Mayor of Harrogate, 1909–1910 and 1910–1911; Alderman of the Borough and represented Harrogate in West Riding County Council, 1910–1919. He was elected as Conservative Member of Parliament (MP) for Bradford North from 1918 to 1923, for Coventry from 1924 to 1929 and for Chertsey from 1931.

Boyd-Carpenter held ministerial office as Parliamentary Secretary to the Ministry of Labour from November 1922 until March 1923, Financial Secretary to the Treasury from March to May 1923, Parliamentary and Financial Secretary to the Admiralty and Paymaster-General from May 1923 until January 1924. Boyd-Carpenter was knighted in 1926.

Boyd-Carpenter married Annie Dugdale in 1907 and they had a son and daughter. He died on 27 May 1937 in Harrogate, aged 64. His son, John, was also a Conservative MP and Minister.

References

External links
 

1873 births
1937 deaths
Highland Light Infantry officers
British Army personnel of the Second Boer War
Conservative Party (UK) MPs for English constituencies
People educated at Harrow School
Alumni of Balliol College, Oxford
Presidents of the Oxford Union
UK MPs 1918–1922
UK MPs 1922–1923
UK MPs 1924–1929
UK MPs 1931–1935
UK MPs 1935–1945
Military personnel from Yorkshire
British Army personnel of World War I
Politics of Bradford
Archibald
Knights Bachelor
Politicians awarded knighthoods
Members of West Riding County Council
Mayors of Harrogate